Yakima Canutt (November 29, 1895 – May 24, 1986) was an American rodeo rider, actor, stuntman and action director who developed many stunt riding techniques while introducing safety measures and devices of his own design; and either directed, coordinated stunts or appeared in over 300 films:

Filmography

References

 
 
 
 
 
 

Male actor filmographies
American filmographies